Marianne Rosenberg (born 10 March 1955) is a German Schlager music singer and songwriter.

Personal background
Rosenberg is of Roma and Sinti background. Her father, Otto, an Auschwitz death camp survivor,  was an activist on Roma and Sinti issues. Her sister, Petra, also advocates for Roma issues.

Career
Rosenberg's musical career was consolidated throughout the 1970s with hits such as "" ("Stranger"), "" ("He belongs to me"), "" ("I am like you") which was later sampled by Blue Adonis on their track "Disco Cop", "Marleen", and "" ("Songs of the Night"), often making appearances on TV and radio. 

She is considered one of the most successful performers of German Schlager of the last four decades. She was one of the first German singers to introduce disco in the German music market with "Ich bin wie du". Her career underwent another revival in 1989 with the hit song "I Need Your Love Tonight" from the soundtrack  ("Racetrack Rivals"), written by Dieter Bohlen.

Eurovision Song Contest
"" was a finalist in the competition to select a Eurovision Song Contest entry for Germany in 1975 but only placed tenth, even though the song became one of Rosenberg's biggest hits. Rosenberg's attempts to sing in Eurovision took a surprising turn in 1976 when she was shortlisted to represent Luxembourg with the song "". Although it did not win, it went on to be a German hit under the title "". In 1978, Rosenberg competed in the German heats again, and this time placed seventh with "" ("No, I Won't Cry"). Her 1980 entry "" ("I'll Be There If There Is a Storm") was not as successful, finishing twelfth (and last). Rosenberg's final challenge for Eurovision was in 1982 with the song "", a ballad which took eighth place.

Rosenberg also achieved chart success in other European countries, including Austria and the Netherlands. She is also considered a gay icon in several countries, such as the Netherlands and her native Germany.

Continued success 

In 2004, Rosenberg re-released Marleen in a remixed version and with a new promotional video. The single reached number 33 on the official German Charts as compiled by Media Control. The follow-up single "" reached number 77. Both singles were taken from her 2004 disco-flavoured album , which reached number 12 on the German album charts, and consisted of remakes of her hits from the 70s.

In 2008, Rosenberg released her first jazz and chanson album, I'm a Woman.

In 2011 she released her first album with new music since Himmlisch in 2000. With Regenrhythmus she was trying to change her sound from being a German Schlager singer to a more modern sound. She was involved in the production of the album and received positive reviews for the result. The album reached number 29 on the German charts.

It wasn't until 2020 when Rosenberg released her next album. With Im Namen der Liebe she made it to the number 1 spot of the German album charts for the first time in her career. She released a Jubiläums Edition of the successful album later in 2020, which contained a second CD with remixes and new songs.

Discography 
 1970 Mr. Paul McCartney (D-Charts: # 33)
 1972  (D-Charts: # 8)
 1972  (D-Charts: # 5)
 1972  (D-Charts: # 26)
 1973  (D-Charts: # 9)
 1973  (D-Charts: # 40)
 1974  (D-Charts: # 21)
 1974  (D-Charts: # 20)
 1975  (D-Charts: # 46)
 1975  (D-Charts: # 7)
 1975  (D-Charts: # 18)
 1976  (D-Charts: # 6)
 1977 Marleen (D-Charts: # 5)
 1977  (D-Charts: # 45)
 1977 
 1978 
 1978 Cariblue
 1978 Andreas
 1979 
 1979  (D-Charts: # 25)
 1979 
 1980 
 1980 
 1980  (D-Charts: # 54)
 1980  (D-Charts: # 31)
 1982  (D-Charts: # 32)
 1982 
 1989  (D-Charts: # 56)
 1989 
 1990 
 1992 
 1992 
 2000 
 2000 
 2000 
 2001 
 2004 
 2004   (D-Charts: # 12)
 2008 I'm a Woman
 2011  (CD single)
 2011  (D-Charts # 29)
 2011  (CD single)
 2011  (CD single)
 2013  (CD single)
 2020 Im Namen der Liebe (D-Charts: # 1)
 2020 Im Namen der Liebe (Jubiläums Edition)
 2022  (D-Charts # 5)

References

External links 

Official website

1955 births
Living people
Musicians from Berlin
German women singers
German women musicians
German Sinti people
German people of Romani descent
German songwriters
Schlager musicians
Deutschland sucht den Superstar judges